Benjie E. Wimberly (born December 1, 1964) is an American teacher and Democratic Party politician who represents the 35th Legislative District in the New Jersey General Assembly. He was also the head coach of the football team at Hackensack High School and is serving as the recreation director of Paterson.

Education
Wimberly graduated from Passaic County Technical Institute in Wayne, and Virginia State University where he received a Bachelor of Arts degree in sociology.

Football coach
Wimberly was an assistant coach for Eastside High School in Paterson from 1989 through 1994. He then served as the head coach of the football team at Paterson Catholic High School from 1995 through 2010, when the school ceased operations. In his last seven years at Paterson Catholic, Wimberly amassed a 70–3 win–loss record, and mentored Victor Cruz. During his 16 years as coach, Paterson Catholic won seven state championships.  Wimberly became the head coach of the football team at Hackensack High School in 2012, succeeding Mike Miello. He is also serving as Paterson's Recreation Director.

Elective office
In 2010, Wimberly was elected to the Paterson city council.  Several of his former students volunteered for his campaign, as he courted the youth vote in a method similar to Barack Obama during the 2008 presidential election.

Wimberly won election to the New Jersey General Assembly in 2011, and was reelected in 2013.

Wimberly considered a run for mayor of Paterson in the 2014 election.

In 2020, he was one of the co-sponsors of Assembly Bill 4454 (now N.J.S.A. 18A:35-4.36a) which requires that a curriculum on diversity and inclusion be part of the school curriculum for students in kindergarten through twelfth grade.

Committee assignments 
Committee assignments for the 2022—23 Legislative Session session are:
Budget, Vice-Chair
Housing 
Transportation and Independent Authorities

District 35 
Each of the 40 districts in the New Jersey Legislature has one representative in the New Jersey Senate and two members in the New Jersey General Assembly. The representatives from the 35th District for the 2022—23 Legislative Session are:
Senator Nellie Pou  (D)
Assemblywoman Shavonda E. Sumter  (D)
Assemblyman Benjie E. Wimberly  (D)

Personal life
Wimberly and his wife, Kimberlyn, have four children. His oldest son Justin played high school football for Don Bosco Preparatory High School in Ramsey, New Jersey.

References

External links
New Jersey Legislature web page
 

|-

1964 births
20th-century African-American sportspeople
21st-century African-American politicians
21st-century American politicians
African-American coaches of American football
African-American state legislators in New Jersey
Living people
Democratic Party members of the New Jersey General Assembly
New Jersey city council members
Place of birth missing (living people)
Politicians from Paterson, New Jersey
Virginia State University alumni